Callophrys augustinus, the brown elfin, is butterfly of the family Lycaenidae. It is found from Newfoundland north and west through the northern United States and the prairie provinces to Alaska. To the south it ranges in Appalachian Mountains to northern Georgia and northern Alabama, further south through the western mountains to northern Baja California in Mexico. Subspecies iroides is known as the western elfin.

The wingspan is 22–29 mm. Adults are on wing from early May to early June in one generation. They feed on flower nectar from various species, including Vaccinium, Sanicula arctopoides, Lindera, Salix, Barbarea and Prunus americana.

The larvae feed on Ericaceae species, including Vaccinium vacillans and Ledum groenlandicum in the east. They feed on a wide variety of plants in the west, including Arbutus and Cuscuta species. They feed on the flowers and fruits of their host plant. Pupation takes place in the litter at the base of the host plant. Hibernation takes place in the pupal stage.

Subspecies
Callophrys augustinus augustinus
Callophrys augustinus helenae (dos Passos, 1943) (Newfoundland)
Callophrys augustinus croesioides (Scudder, 1876)
Callophrys augustinus iroides (Boisduval, 1852) (British Columbia to California)
Callophrys augustinus annettae (dos Passos, 1943) (New Mexico)
Callophrys augustinus concava Austin, 1998 (Nevada)

References

Callophrys
Butterflies of North America
Butterflies described in 1852
Taxa named by John O. Westwood